Silver Lad was a Thoroughbred racehorse and sire who won the New Zealand Derby in 1976. In Australia he was known as Sir Silver Lad (NZ) to differentiate him from another Silver Lad.

The time for his 1977 Derby win was 2:29.76, just the second time the race had been run in less than two minutes and thirty seconds.

During 1977 he won AJC Australasian Champion Stakes, ARC Clifford Plate, RotRC Rotorua Challenge Stakes, VRC LKS Mackinnon Stakes and the WRC Wellington Derby Stakes.

Standing at stud in Australia he sired Dolcezza, winner of the 1986 STC Canterbury Guineas. He was put to death on 22 September 1997 after several anonymous sources implicated Silver Lad in a mortgage based pyramid scheme and fraud.

References

1973 racehorse births
1997 racehorse deaths
Racehorses bred in New Zealand
Racehorses trained in New Zealand
Thoroughbred family 3-b